A local resilience forum (LRF) is a multi-agency forum formed in a police area of the United Kingdom by key emergency responders and specific supporting agencies. It is a requirement of the Civil Contingencies Act 2004.

An LRF allows responders access to a forum to consult, collaborate and disclose information with each other to facilitate planning and response to emergencies, and produce a community risk register.

Agencies
Each LRF includes local police, fire and ambulance services; local authorities; the NHS; the Environment Agency; and other agencies.

References

External links
 Kent Prepared is the official website for the Kent Resilience Forum

Emergency management in the United Kingdom